James Frank Copley  (29 December 1953 – 13 May 2017) was an English rock drummer.

Copley was largely a session musician and worked with Jeff Beck, Graham Parker, Upp, Paul Young, Magnum, Roger Glover, Ian Gillan and Glenn Hughes of Deep Purple, Go West, Killing Joke, Tears for Fears, Seal, Tony Iommi and Paul Rodgers. He was the drummer with Manfred Mann's Earth Band from 2007.

He was a master of the open-handed drumming technique. This method dispenses with crossing the hands when playing the hi-hat and snare drum simultaneously, as opposed to the more traditional way of playing drums which features crossed hands as the basic playing position.

Copley was a long-term Tama Drums endorser. He used Superstar, Granstar, Artstar II and Starclassic drums throughout the years. Another long time association was with Zildjian Cymbals. He also used Vic Firth drumsticks.

Death
According to University Hospital Bristol, Copley had been diagnosed with leukemia in 2015 and relapsed following a bone marrow transplant. He opted to discontinue chemotherapy. In Copley's final days, his hospital room was transformed into a temporary recording studio so that he and friends could record an EP to benefit the Bristol Haematology and Oncology Centre and Royal United Hospital, in Bristol.

Selected discography

Upp
 Upp (1975)
 This Way Upp (1976)

Killing Joke
 Outside the Gate (1988)

Tears For Fears
 Tears for Fears: Live at Knebworth '90 (Change, Badman's Song, Everybody Wants to Rule the World) (1990)
 Going To California (Live from Santa Barbara) (1990)

Psychedelix
 Move On/Green Light (1992)
 Psychedelix (1992)
 no one's wastin' time (live album, 1992)
 Rowdy Boys (1993)
 Psychedelix II (1994)
 Livin' In Osaka (1994)
 Merry-Go-Round (1995)
 Stand (1995)
 Stand e.p. (1995)
 Smoky (1996)
 On-Gaeshi 1 (live album, 1999)
 On-Gaeshi 2 (live album, 1999)
 Edoya Collection 1992-1996 (1999)
 20th March 1994 (live DVD, 2000)
 Move On Tour Stage 1 (live DVD, 2005)
 New Classics (2008)

Stone Free - Jimi Hendrix Tribute
 Stone Free - Jimi Hendrix Tribute (1993)

Curt Smith
 Soul on Board (1993)

Martin Page
 In the House of Stone and Light (1994)

The Pretenders
 Last of the Independents (1994)

Paul Rodgers
Live: The Loreley Tapes (live album, 1996)
Now (1997)
Now and Live (2-CD compilation, 1997)
Electric (2000)

Char
 Days Went By 1988-1993 (1993)
 20th Anniversary "Electric Guitar Concert" (live album, 1997)
 Today (1998)
 Let It Blow (1998)
 Touch My Love Again (1999)
 I’m Gonna Take This Chance (1999)
 Char Edoya Collection 1988-1997 (1999)
 Char Plays Ballad (1999)
 20th Anniversary "Electric Guitar Concert" (live DVD, 1999)
 Share The Wonder (2000)
 Char Played With And Without (live album, 2000)
 Bamboo Joints (2001)
 Char Psyche 1988 (live album, 2002)
 Live In Nippon Budokan 2001 "Bamboo Joints" (live DVD, 2002)
 Sacred Hills (2002)
 Mr.70’s You Set Me Free (2003)
 Singles 1976-2005 (2006)
 Tradrock "Jeff" by Char (2011)

Mayfield
 Mayfield (1998)

Tony Iommi
Iommi (2000)
The 1996 DEP Sessions (2004)

Go West
The Best Of Go West - The Runaway Train Tour (1987)

Magnum
 Livin' The Dream (2005 live DVD)
 Princess Alice and the Broken Arrow (2007)

Jimmy Copley
 Slap My Hand (2008)

Jimmy Copley & Char
 Slap My Hand Special Session (live DVD, 2009)

References

1953 births
2017 deaths
English rock drummers
Manfred Mann's Earth Band members
Musicians from London
English heavy metal drummers
English session musicians
Deaths from leukemia
Deaths from cancer in England
Magnum (band) members
The Company of Snakes members